Schwanfeld is a municipality in the Schweinfurt district in Bavaria, Germany.

References

Schweinfurt (district)